Lucy is a NASA space probe on a twelve-year journey to ten different asteroids, visiting two main belt asteroids as well as eight Jupiter trojans, asteroids which share Jupiter's orbit around the Sun, orbiting either ahead of or behind the planet. All target encounters will be flyby encounters. The Lucy spacecraft is the centerpiece of a US$981 million mission.

On 4 January 2017, Lucy was chosen, along with the Psyche mission, as NASA's Discovery Program missions 13 and 14 respectively.

The mission is named after the Lucy hominin fossils, because study of the trojans could reveal the "fossils of planet formation": materials that clumped together in the early history of the Solar System to form planets and other bodies. The hominid was named after the 1967 Beatles song "Lucy in the Sky with Diamonds". The spacecraft carries a disc made of lab-grown diamonds for its L'TES instrument.

Overview 

Lucy was launched from Cape Canaveral SLC-41 on 16 October 2021, at 09:34 UTC on the 401 variant of a United Launch Alliance Atlas V launch vehicle.  It gained one gravity assist from Earth on the 16th of October, 2022, and after making a flyby of the asteroid 152830 Dinkinesh in 2023, it will gain another in 2024. In 2025, it will fly by the inner main-belt asteroid 52246 Donaldjohanson, which was named after the discoverer of the Lucy hominin fossil. In 2027, it will arrive at the  Trojan cloud (the Greek camp of asteroids that orbits about 60° ahead of Jupiter), where it will fly by four Trojans, 3548 Eurybates (with its satellite), 15094 Polymele, 11351 Leucus, and 21900 Orus. After these flybys, Lucy will return to Earth in 2031 for another gravity assist toward the  Trojan cloud (the Trojan camp which trails about 60° behind Jupiter), where it will visit the binary Trojan 617 Patroclus with its satellite Menoetius in 2033. The mission may end with the Patroclus–Menoetius flyby, but at that point Lucy will be in a stable, 6-year orbit between the L4 and L5 clouds, and a mission extension will be possible.

Three instruments comprise the payload: a high-resolution visible imager, an optical and near-infrared imaging spectrometer, and a thermal infrared spectrometer. Harold F. Levison of the Southwest Research Institute in Boulder, Colorado is the principal investigator, with Cathy Olkin of Southwest Research Institute as the mission's deputy principal investigator. NASA's Goddard Space Flight Center will manage the project.

Exploration of Jupiter Trojans is one of the high-priority goals outlined in the Planetary Science Decadal Survey. Jupiter Trojans have been observed by ground-based telescopes and the Wide-field Infrared Survey Explorer to be "dark with... surfaces that reflect little sunlight". The Jupiter Trojans are at a similar distance but can be somewhat farther or closer to the Sun depending on where they are in their orbits. There may be as many Trojans as there are asteroids in the asteroid belt.

Development 

NASA selected Lucy through the Discovery Program Announcement of Opportunity (AO) released on 5 November 2014. Lucy was submitted as part of a call for proposals for the next mission(s) for Discovery Program that closed in February 2015. Proposals had to be ready to launch by the end of 2021. Twenty-eight proposals were received in all.

On 30 September 2015, Lucy was selected as one of five finalist missions, each of which received US$3 million to produce more in-depth concept design studies and analyses. Its fellow finalists were DAVINCI, NEOCam, Psyche and VERITAS. On 4 January 2017, Lucy and Psyche were selected for development and launch.

On 31 January 2019, NASA announced that Lucy would launch in October 2021 on an Atlas V 401 launch vehicle from Cape Canaveral, Florida. The total cost for the launch was estimated to be US$148.3 million. On 11 February 2019, SpaceX protested the contract award, claiming that it could launch Lucy into the same orbit at a "significantly cheaper cost". On 4 April 2019, SpaceX withdrew the protest.

On 28 August 2020, NASA announced that Lucy had passed its Key Decision Point-D (KDP-D) with a "green light" to assemble and test the spacecraft and its instruments. The spacecraft instruments arrived beginning with L'LORRI on 26 October 2020. On 30 July 2021, the spacecraft was transported on a C-17 transport aircraft to Florida for launch preparations, and Lucy was encapsulated into the rocket fairing on 30 September 2021.

Lucy was launched on 16 October 2021 at 09:34 UTC at the opening of its 23-day launch window.

Scientific instruments 
The science payload includes:

 L'Ralph – panchromatic and color visible imager (0.4–0.85 μm) and infrared spectroscopic mapper (1–3.6 μm). L'Ralph is based on the Ralph instrument on New Horizons and was built at Goddard Space Flight Center. It will be used to measure silicates, ices, and organics at the surface. The L'Ralph instrument has a three-mirror anastigmat design f/6 with a 75 mm aperture. The telescope structure is composed from one aluminum block to provide an athermal imaging system. A beamsplitter transmits the longer wavelength light to LEISA and reflects light short of ∼960 nm to MVIC. The instrument is passively cooled with a 20-inch diameter radiator that cools the LEISA detector to ∼100 K. A new component of the L'Ralph instrument compared with its predecessors is a scan mirror assembly. The scan mirror is used to sweep the target across the Ralph focal planes to build up either visible images or infrared spectra.

 L'LORRI – high-resolution visible imager. L'LORRI is derived from the LORRI instrument on New Horizons and was built at the Johns Hopkins University Applied Physics Laboratory. It will provide the most detailed images of the surface of the Trojans. L'LORRI uses the same detector and has the same optical design as New Horizons LORRI. The primary mirror has a diameter of 20.8 cm, the system has a focal length of 262 cm, and the detector is a 1024 × 1024 thinned back-illuminated frame transfer CCD from Teledyne e2v. Each pixel subtends 5 μrad and will have a point-spread function with a FWHM of less than 15 μrad. Differences from the heritage instrument worth noting are the addition of redundant electronics, memory to store LORRI data, and the difference in the instrument accommodation. On New Horizons, the LORRI instrument is inside of the spacecraft, but on Lucy L'LORRI is mounted on an Instrument Pointing Platform (IPP).

 L'TES – thermal infrared spectrometer (6–75 μm). L'TES is similar to OTES on the OSIRIS-REx mission and was built at Arizona State University. It will reveal the thermal characteristics of the observed Trojans, which will also inform the composition and structure of the material on the surface of the asteroids. OTES was used to derive the surface composition and thermal inertia of the asteroid Bennu. However, because the Trojan asteroids at 5 au are much colder than Bennu, the Lucy mission does not plan to use L'TES to derive surface composition. Instead, L'TES will be used primarily to infer regolith properties. L'TES has the same optical–mechanical design as OTES, including a 15.2 cm diameter Cassegrain telescope, a Michelson interferometer with chemical vapor deposited diamond beamsplitter, and an uncooled, deuterated L-alanine doped triglycine sulfate (DLATGS) pyroelectric detector. L'TES has only small differences from the heritage instrument including removing a potential stray light path by modifying the telescope baffle and primary mirror inner diameter and improvements to the metrology laser system. An internal calibration cone blackbody target provides radiometric calibration. The L'TES instrument collects data from 6–75 μm and has a noise equivalent spectral radiance (NESR) of 2.310−8 W cm−2 sr−1/cm−1 between 300 cm−1 (7.4 μm) and 1350 cm−1 (33 μm). For surfaces with temperatures greater than 75K, L'TES will determine the temperature with an accuracy of 2K. The 50% encircled energy of the instrument subtends 6.5 mrad. L'TES has one mode of taking data. It continuously collects interferograms (every 0.5, 1.0, or 2.0 s) and transfers them to the spacecraft for storage before downlink. The instrument will start collecting data one day before closest approach, which is before the target fills the instrument's FOV. The data collection will continue until one day after closest approach. The L'TES instrument will measure the radiance of each Trojan asteroid at four locations at different local times of day with the additional requirement that one observation measures a location within 30° of the subsolar point and another measures the unilluminated surface.
 The radio science investigation will determine the mass of the Trojans by using the spacecraft radio telecommunications hardware and high-gain antenna to measure Doppler shifts.
 T2CAM – terminal tracking camera (T2CAM or TTCAM) would be used to take wide-field images of the asteroids to better constrain the asteroids shapes.

Golden Plaque 

Onboard the spacecraft is a golden plaque that contains its launch date, the positions of the planets at the launch date, the continents of Earth at the time of launch, its nominal trajectory, and twenty speeches, poems, and song lyrics from people such as Martin Luther King Jr., Carl Sagan, The Beatles, and more. Because the spacecraft will not leave the Solar System or be intentionally crashed into a planetary body, there is a chance that future generations of humanity will be able to recover it.

Targets 

The specific asteroids that are targeted for flyby observation passes performed by the spacecraft include:

Propulsion 
Lucy has several different engines:

Nammo LEROS 1c:
 Count: 1
 Type: hypergolic bipropellant engine
 Propellant: MON/Hydrazine
 Thrust: 458 N (386-470 N)
 Specific Impulse: 324 s

Aerojet Rocketdyne MR-103J:
 Count: 8
 Type: catalytic monopropellant thruster
 Propellant: Hydrazine
 Thrust: 1 N (0.19-1.13 N)
 Specific Impulse: 202-224 s

Aerojet Rocketdyne MR-106L:
 Count: 6
 Type: catalytic monopropellant thruster
 Propellant: Hydrazine
 Thrust: 22 N (10-34 N)
 Specific Impulse: 228-235 s

Flight 

Although the Lucy concept originated in late 2014, and was selected for funding in 2015, the Lucy spaceflight began on 16 October 2021 with the launch of the Lucy spacecraft aboard a United Launch Alliance Atlas V 401 launch vehicle into a stable parking orbit. During the next hour, the second stage reignited to place Lucy on an interplanetary trajectory in a heliocentric orbit on a twelve-year mission to two groups of Sun-Jupiter Trojan asteroids as well as close flybys of main belt asteroids during one of three planned passes through the asteroid belt. If the spacecraft remains operational during the 12-year planned duration, it is likely the mission will be extended and directed to additional asteroid targets.

Solar array deployment problems
On October 16, 2021 Lucy began to unfurl its two solar arrays. While the initial deployment of the arrays appeared to go smoothly, it was later discovered that one of the solar arrays failed to securely latch into open position. Thomas Zurbuchen, NASA's associate administrator for science, stressed the spacecraft remained "safe and stable". Later testing on October 26 indicated the affected array was between 75 and 95 percent of full deployment. , the spacecraft is in cruise mode. NASA has stated they are reviewing a range of potential options, including simply letting the array remain as it is. In late January 2022 NASA announced that they had found out the cause why one of the solar arrays did not deploy fully and latch open securely; at the time, the agency's view was that there were two options to proceed: try to redeploy the solar array by some more running of the motor that pulled the array open, trying to get the array to deploy fully and latch into place, or as the other option, leave the array as is, not trying to fully open it. Even with one solar array only partially deployed, the spacecraft was generating enough power for the mission. NASA said it would consider thoroughly its options and only take action at a (much) later time, as the issue was not an imminent risk to the mission.

On May 9, 2022 Lucy executed its first step in completing the deployment of the unlatched solar array. This first step was intended to validate that the team's ground testing adequately represented the flight system's performance and was not meant to fully latch the array. After reviewing the data, the next planned step was for another deployment effort to fully latch the solar array. 

By August 5 2022, NASA reported that solar array is between 353 degrees and 357 degrees open (out of 360 degrees) but not latched, making it stable enough for the spacecraft to operate as needed for mission operations. 

After the attempt on December 13, 2022, the team suspended further work with the solar panels.

See also 
 DESTINY+, a planned JAXA mission to flyby multiple asteroids.
 Jupiter Icy Moons Explorer, a planned ESA mission to the Jupiter system.
 OKEANOS, a proposed solar sail mission to Jupiter Trojans.

References

External links 

 Mission website at NASA.gov
 
 Lucy: NASA's mission to Jupiter's Trojans at eoPortal
 Designing Lucy’s Path to the Trojan Asteroids

Discovery Program
Jupiter trojans
Missions to asteroids
NASA space probes
Spacecraft launched by Atlas rockets
Spacecraft launched in 2021
Space probes launched in 2021
Satellites orbiting the Sun